Kharkiv college of textile and design is a Ukrainian state higher educational establishment in Kharkiv.

Post address: Harkova, st. Danilevsky, 3

Campuses and buildings
Studying is organized in the buildings number 1 and 2 of the college. The total area of the buildings is 16181square meters, namely:
studying (classrooms, laboratories, workshops,6 computer classrooms with 100 modern computers and high-speed access
to the Internet (923 square meters area);
a hostel with 537 places of 6943 square meters area;
2 libraries with two reading halls of 161 square meters area;
a typical sport hall of 260 square meters area;
a sports ground, training rooms in the hostel;
a canteen and a bar with 60 places of the 130 square meters area;
an assembly hall of the 144 square meters area;

Ukrainian cultural center and the museum of the college.

Institutes and faculties
For the organization of technical, educational work and practical training there are10 commissions:
social sciences;
humanities;
Physical and Mathematical Sciences;
general engineering and mechanical disciplines;
design and construction of consumer goods and hairdressing art;
sewing manufacture;
manufacture and design of yarns, fabrics and knitted goods;
chemical technology, finishing production and applied ecology;
economics;
physical education and military training.

Famous alumni
Designer Andre Tan, well known in the world. His name was recorded into the book of Guinness Records of Ukraine;
Bondarenko A.M. – honorary council of Slovenia in Kharkiv.

References
Official site
Ukrainian Wikipedia

Universities in Ukraine
Textile schools